Chris Houston (born 15 February 1985) is an Australian former professional rugby league footballer who last played for the Widnes Vikings in the Super League.

Background
Born in Narooma, New South Wales, Houston played his junior football for the Narooma Devils before being signed by the St. George Illawarra Dragons. Houston played for the Dragons' Premier League reserve-grade team in 2006.

Playing career
In round 3 of the 2007 NRL season, Houston made his NRL debut for St. George Illawarra against the North Queensland Cowboys.

In late 2007, Houston signed a contract with the Newcastle Knights starting in 2008.  In round 13 of the 2008 NRL season, Houston made his first appearance as a captain due to the Newcastle Knights regular captain Kurt Gidley and vice-captain Steve Simpson being unavailable for the match.  In March 2010, Houston was served with a notice to attend court on charges of supplying ecstasy and cocaine. He voluntarily terminated his contract with the Newcastle club.

On 17 December 2010, Houston was cleared of all charges On 23 December 2010, due to being cleared of all charges, Houston signed a new two-year contract with the Newcastle Knights starting in 2011.

On 31 July 2012, Houston re-signed with Newcastle on a two-year contract.

Houston made 992 tackles in the 2012 season, averaging over 41 tackles a game, the most of any player in the National Rugby League.

On 31 October 2014, Houston re-signed with Newcastle on a two-year contract. On 2 December 2015, Houston signed a two-year contract with Super League side Widnes Vikings starting in 2016, after being told he was free to look elsewhere by incoming Knights coach Nathan Brown.

On 11 July 2017, it was announced that Houston had signed an extension of his contract with Widnes, keeping him at the club until the end of 2018.

Representative career
In 2009, Houston was named 18th man for New South Wales in Game 3 of the 2009 State of Origin series, however he didn't play.

In 2011, Houston played for Country against City in the annual City vs Country Origin match.

References

External links
Widnes Vikings profile
Newcastle Knights profile
SL profile

1985 births
Living people
Australian rugby league players
Australian expatriate sportspeople in England
Country New South Wales Origin rugby league team players
St. George Illawarra Dragons players
Newcastle Knights players
Newcastle Knights captains
Maitland Pickers players
Rugby league second-rows
Rugby league locks
Rugby league players from New South Wales
Rugby league props